Astronium fraxinifolium is a timber tree, which is native to Amazon Rainforest, Atlantic Forest, Caatinga, and Cerrado vegetation in Brazil. Common names include kingwood, locustwood, tigerwood, and zebrawood. It is known in Portuguese as Gonçalo-alves. This plant is cited in Flora Brasiliensis by Carl Friedrich Philipp von Martius. It is also used to make hardwood such as tigerwood.

References

External links
Astronium fraxinifolium
 Astronium fraxinifolium photo
 Astronium fraxinifolium
 Flora Brasiliensis: Astronium fraxinifolium

fraxinifolium
Endemic flora of Brazil
Trees of Brazil
Trees of the Amazon
Flora of the Atlantic Forest
Flora of the Cerrado
Vulnerable flora of South America
Plants described in 1827